The 1972 Commercial Union Assurance Grand Prix was a tennis circuit administered by the International Lawn Tennis Federation which served as a forerunner to the current Association of Tennis Professionals (ATP) World Tour and the Women's Tennis Association (WTA) Tour. The circuit consisted of the four modern Grand Slam tournaments and open tournaments recognised by the ILTF. This article covers all tournaments that were part of that year's Women's Grand Prix.

Schedule

Key

January

February

March

April

May

June

July

August

September

November

December

Standings

Statistical information
The list of winners and number of titles won, last name alphabetically:

The following players won their first title in 1972:

References

Further reading

See also
 1972 World Championship Tennis circuit
 1972 Men's Grand Prix (tennis)

Women's Grand Prix